The Hogeschool Zeeland Tournament (or HZ Tournament) is an annual international chess tournament which takes place in Vlissingen, Netherlands. The first two editions, held in 1995 and 1996, were known as Zeeland Open. It is hosted by the HZ University of Applied Sciences.

List of winners

Zeeland Open
{| class="sortable wikitable"
! Year !! Winner
|-
| 1995 || 
|-
| 1996 || 
|-
|}

HZ Tournament
{| class="sortable wikitable"
! # !! Year !! Winner
|-
| 1 || 1997 || 
|-
| 2 || 1998 || 
|-
| 3 || 1999 || 
|-
| 4 || 2000 ||  
|-
| 5 || 2001 || 
|-
| 6 || 2002 || 
|-
| 7 || 2003 || 
|-
| 8 || 2004 || 
|-
| 9 || 2005 || 
|-
| 10 || 2006 || 
|-
| 11 || 2007 || 
|-
| 12 || 2008 || 
|-
| 13 || 2009 || 
|-
| 14 || 2010 || 
|-
| 15 || 2011 || 
|-
| 16 || 2012 || 
|-
| 17 || 2013 || 
|-
| 18 || 2014 || 
|-
| 19 || 2015 || 
|-
| 20 || 2016 || 
|-
| 21 || 2017 || 
|-
| 22 || 2018 || 
|}

References

Chess competitions
Chess in the Netherlands
1995 in chess
Recurring sporting events established in 1995
Sports competitions in Zeeland
Sport in Vlissingen